Sylvette Herry (born 22 February 1950), known professionally as Miou-Miou, is a French actress. A ten-time César Award nominee, she won the César Award for Best Actress for the 1979 film Memoirs of a French Whore. Her other films include This Sweet Sickness (1977), Entre Nous (1983), May Fools (1990), Germinal (1993), Dry Cleaning (1997) and Arrêtez-moi (2013). In her career she has worked with a number of international directors, including Michel Gondry, Bertrand Blier, Claude Berri, Jacques Deray, Patrice Leconte, Joseph Losey and Louis Malle.

Early life
Miou-Miou was born Sylvette Herry in Paris. Her stage name, Miou-Miou (a reference to the sound of a cat), was given to her by Coluche. She was raised in Paris by her mother, a greengrocer.

Career 

After studying acting Miou-Miou worked in improvisational theater with Coluche and Patrick Dewaere, joining with them to help found the new comedy theatre Café de la Gare. She made her film debut in La vie sentimentale de Georges Le Tueur and La Cavale (both 1971).

In 1973 she appeared in three films, Elle court, elle court la banlieue, Les granges brulées and Les aventures de Rabbi Jacob. Her big break came with Blier's Going Places, released in 1974. During the 1970s, she had roles in such films as F comme Fairbanks (1976), Alain Tanner's Jonah Who Will Be 25 in the Year 2000 (1976), and Losey's Roads to the South (1978). In Memoirs of a French Whore (1979), directed by Daniel Duval, she portrayed a young prostitute and received a César Award for the role. Many of these 1970s films were released internationally to art-house venues. In 1976 she appeared in one of the last Spaghetti Westerns, Damiano Damiani's A Genius, Two Friends, and an Idiot.

Through the 1980s she was in such films as La gueule du loup (1981), Guy de Maupassant (1982), Diane Kurys's Entre nous (1983) with Isabelle Huppert, Blanche et Marie (1984), Evening Dress (1986), and Deville's The Reader (1988). She played opposite Lee Marvin (in one of his last roles) in Boisset's Dog Day in 1984.

The 1990s saw her in Louis Malle's May Fools (1990), Deray's thriller Netchaïev is back, the comedy Un indien dans la ville (1994), and The Eighth Day (1996) and Dry Cleaning in 1997. She appeared opposite Gérard Depardieu in a new production of Émile Zola's Germinal (1993).  2001 saw her in Agathe et le grand magasin and in 2004 she appeared in L'après-midi de monsieur Andesmas, among other films.

By the mid-2000s, her film roles abated and she began to appear in theatre.

Personal life 

Miou-Miou has two daughters, Angèle Herry-Leclerc (born 1974), whose father is actor Patrick Dewaere, and Jeanne Herry (born 1978), whose father is singer Julien Clerc.

Filmography

References

External links 
 

1950 births
Living people
Actresses from Paris
French people of Breton descent
French film actresses
Spaghetti Western actresses
Best Actress César Award winners
Best Actress Lumières Award winners
20th-century French actresses
21st-century French actresses
French stage actresses
Café de la Gare